The Women's National Basketball League Most Valuable Player (MVP) is an annual Women's National Basketball League (WNBL) award given since the league's second season. MVP voting takes place throughout the regular season and is determined by a players' accumulated score from game-by-game voting.  In every game, each head coach and the referees from each respective game complete a voting card, with three points being awarded for a first place vote, two for second, one for third, a player can take a maximum of nine votes from any one game. It is the most prestigious award for individual players in the WNBL.

Suzy Batkovic is the most decorated player in WNBL history, winning the prestigious award a record six times. Due to this, from 2019 onwards the award will be known as the Suzy Batkovic Most Valuable Player Award (known as the Suzy Batkovic Medal). Highly regarded as one of the greatest of all time, Lauren Jackson also won the award four times, and solely held the record until 2016.

Winners

Multi-time winners

See also 
 All-WNBL Team
 WNBL Defensive Player of the Year Award
 WNBA Most Valuable Player Award
 NBL Most Valuable Player Award
 Australia women's national basketball team

References 

Most Valuable
Awards established in 1982
Basketball most valuable player awards
1982 establishments in Australia